Bernard Park (born January 29, 1993), also known as Nakjoon, is a Korean singer, born and raised in America. He is best known as the winning contestant of K-pop Star Season 3. He made his official debut on October 13, 2014 with his first extended play I'm.

History

Early life 
Bernard Park, also known by his Korean name Park Nak-joon (Korean: 박낙준), hails from Atlanta, Georgia and is the youngest son of his father who runs a laundry shop in Marietta. He graduated from North Gwinnett High School, and before going to South Korea in order to participate in the third season of the reality competition show K-pop Star, Park was a part-time worker at a restaurant located near Duluth. Park studied at Gwinnett College, and took a leave of absence in order to focus on his activities with K-pop Star.

Career 
Bernard Park first gained recognition in South Korea by winning on K-pop Star Season 3 in its final episode which aired on April 13, 2014, beating out fellow Korean-American singer Sam Kim. He chose to sign a contract with JYP Entertainment in preparation for his official debut in the music industry. Six months later, Park made his official debut with the release of his first EP, I'm..., on October 13, with the album debuting at its peak position of number 9 on the Gaon Album Chart. The album was supported by the pre-release track of the same name, "I'm (난)", which was a reinterpretation of a song earlier released by Park Jin-young in 1997.

On August 9, 2014, Park participated in the JYP Nation concert "One Mic" which was held at the Jamsil Indoor Gymnasium in Seoul. He performed the song "The Last Time", before collaborating with Miss A member Suzy for the song "Farewell Under the Sun" (대낮에 한 이별). The latter song eventually became the title track for the live concert album which was released on December 10.

On October 15, 2014, Park held his first solo concert titled "Bernard Park's Fall Music Appreciation Concert" at the JBK Convention Hall in Samseong-dong. The following month, Park participated at J.Y.Park's "42 No. 1" 20th Anniversary concert at the Milk Music Live Station, which was held on November 8 at the Olympic Hall located in the Olympic Park, Seoul. Then on December 28, Park performed at the 6th Philippine K-pop Convention held at the SMX Convention Center in Pasay, appearing alongside Sistar and labelmates Got7.

Park then collaborated with labelmates Park Jimin and J.Y.Park with the release of the song "Busan Memories" (부산에 가면) on September 22, 2015. The song reached its peak position of 99 on the Gaon Digital Chart.

On April 4, 2016, Park released the digital single titled "With You" (니가 보인다), which was a duet with Wonder Girls member Hyerim. The song reached a peak position of number 53 on the Gaon Digital Chart. On July 6, Park released the song "Dirt" (먼지) in his first soundtrack participation for the drama A Beautiful Mind.

On June 21, 2017, Park announced that he would be promoting himself in his future activities with his Korean name, Nakjoon, in conjunction with the first reveal of his new song "Blame" featuring rapper Changmo. The song was released as a maxi single on June 28, supported by the B-sides "Your Story" and "Marry Me".

Nakjoon then participated in the soundtrack album for the drama Radio Romance with the release of the song "The Covered Up Road" (가리워진 길), which was released on February 5, 2018. On October 10, he collaborated with former f(x) member Luna for his digital single titled "Still". The single was supported with the pre-release track "Sleep Mode", which was released in both Korean and English on October 7 and was written by labelmate Young K of Day6.

On December 7, it was first announced that Nakjoon would be enlisted for his mandatory military service as an active duty soldier, having given up his US citizenship in order to do so. He later held a mini-fan meeting titled 'Starry Night' to deliver a performance for his fans before undergoing his enlistment. On December 17, he entered the 22nd Division of the ROK Army wherein he began his basic military training and continued his active service in the division's military band. Nakjoon formally finished his military service on July 27, 2020.

Nakjoon made his first onstage performance and media appearance after enlistment with an appearance on MBC's King of Mask Singer in its episode which aired on August 30, 2020.

On October 7, Nakjoon announced that he will go back to using his birth name Bernard Park for his future promotions. In the same month, he participated in the soundtrack album for the JTBC drama More Than Friends with the release of the song "Close Your Eyes", marking his first song after his military enlistment, as well as the return of his birth name for promotions.

On November 15, 2021, Park released a new digital single titled "Bad Influence".

On September 19, 2022, JYP Entertainment announced his departure from the label after deciding not to renew his contract.

Discography

Extended plays

Singles 
{| class="wikitable plainrowheaders" style="text-align:center"
! scope="col" rowspan="2"| Title
! scope="col" rowspan="2"| Year
! scope="col" colspan="1" style="width:5em;" | Peak chart positions
! scope="col" rowspan="2"| Sales
! scope="col" rowspan="2"| Album
|-
! KOR
|-
! scope="row" | "I'm" (난)
| rowspan="3" | 2014
| 32
|
 KOR: 69,628
| rowspan="2" | I'm...
|-
! scope="row" | "Before the Rain"
| 68
| 
 KOR: 28,943
|-
! scope="row" | "Farewell Under the Sun" (대낮에 한 이별)
| 40
|
 KOR: 92,093
| JYP Nation Korea 2014 'One Mic'''
|-
! scope="row" | "Busan Memories" (부산에 가면)
| 2015
| 99
| 
 KOR: 24,900
| rowspan="5" 
|-
! scope="row" | "With You" (니가 보인다)
| 2016
| 53
| 
 KOR: 38,255
|-
! scope="row" | "Blame"
| 2017
| —
| rowspan="4" 
|-
! scope="row" | "Still" 
| 2018
| —
|-
! scope="row" | "Bad Influence" 
| 2021
| —
|-
! scope="row" | "All Day" (하루종일 부르지)
| 2022
| —
| To Whom It May Concern|-
|}

 Soundtrack appearances 

 Other charted songs 

Filmography
 Reality show 
 K-pop Star Season 3 (2013–2014)
 Variety show King of Mask Singer (2020)Artistak Game'' - player (2022)

Awards and nominations

Concerts and tours

Special Concert
Bernard Park's Fall Music Appreciation (2014)

JYP Nation
JYP Nation One Mic in Seoul (2014)
JYP Nation One Mic in Bangkok (2014)

Concert Participation
MILK Music Like Station (Concert for JYP's 20th Years Debut) (2014)
 KPOP Convention 6 in the Philippines (2014)
 GOT7 1st Fan Party in Bangkok ft. Bernard Park (2015)

References

External links

1993 births
Living people
American contemporary R&B singers
American musicians of Korean descent
American male pop singers
JYP Entertainment artists
K-pop Star winners
21st-century American singers
21st-century American male singers